Čađavica may refer to:

Čađavica, Croatia, a municipality in Croatia
Čađavica, Bijeljina, a town in Bosnia and Herzegovina, Republika Srpska
Čađavica Donja (Bosanski Novi)
Čađavica Gornja (Bosanski Novi)
Čađavica Srednja (Bosanski Novi)